Adrian Michael Hadley (born 1 March 1963) is a Welsh former dual-code international rugby union and professional rugby league footballer who played in the 1980s and 1990s, and coached rugby union in the 1990s and 2000s.

Background
Adrian Hadley was born in Cardiff, Wales, he was a pupil at Lady Mary High School.

Rugby union career
Hadley attained 29 caps for the Wales rugby union team between 1983 and 1988, scoring nine tries.

Rugby league career

Hadley later switched codes and moved north to join Salford and represented the Wales national rugby league team.
Hadley was then signed by Phil Larder the then coach at Widnes in 1992, until his departure in 1995 when he left due to unpaid wages.

County Cup Final appearances
Adrian Hadley played , i.e. number 5, in Salford's 17–22 defeat by Wigan in the 1988 Lancashire County Cup Final during the 1988–89 season at Knowsley Road, St. Helens on Sunday 23 October 1988, and played  in the 24–18 defeat by Widnes in the 1990 Lancashire County Cup Final during the 1990–91 season at Central Park, Wigan on Saturday 29 September 1990.

Coaching
He returned to rugby union as player-coach at Sale Sharks in 1996, later becoming director of rugby at the side. He resigned from the post in 2001.

References

External links

1963 births
Living people
Barbarian F.C. players
Cardiff RFC players
Dual-code rugby internationals
Rugby league players from Cardiff
Rugby league wingers
Rugby union centres
Rugby union players from Cardiff
Rugby union wings
Sale Sharks coaches
Sale Sharks players
Salford Red Devils players
Wales international rugby union players
Wales national rugby league team players
Welsh rugby league players
Welsh rugby union coaches
Welsh rugby union players
Widnes Vikings players